Poukawa  is a rural community in the Hastings District and Hawke's Bay Region of New Zealand's North Island.

It is located south of Hastings, off State Highway 2.

Demographics
The SA1 area is part of the larger Poukawa statistical area.

The SA1 area had a population of 156 at the 2018 New Zealand census, an increase of 15 people (10.6%) since the 2013 census, and an increase of 24 people (18.2%) since the 2006 census. There were 51 households, comprising 84 males and 75 females, giving a sex ratio of 1.12 males per female. The median age was 40.5 years (compared with 37.4 years nationally), with 48 people (30.8%) aged under 15 years, 18 (11.5%) aged 15 to 29, 66 (42.3%) aged 30 to 64, and 27 (17.3%) aged 65 or older.

Ethnicities were 75.0% European/Pākehā, 57.7% Māori, 1.9% Pacific peoples, and 1.9% Asian. People may identify with more than one ethnicity.

Although some people chose not to answer the census's question about religious affiliation, 40.4% had no religion, 46.2% were Christian, and 1.9% had Māori religious beliefs.

Of those at least 15 years old, 12 (11.1%) people had a bachelor's or higher degree, and 24 (22.2%) people had no formal qualifications. The median income was $30,100, compared with $31,800 nationally. 12 people (11.1%) earned over $70,000 compared to 17.2% nationally. The employment status of those at least 15 was that 60 (55.6%) people were employed full-time, 15 (13.9%) were part-time, and 3 (2.8%) were unemployed.

Poukawa statistical area

The statistical area had a population of 1,365 at the 2018 New Zealand census, an increase of 93 people (7.3%) since the 2013 census, and an increase of 72 people (5.6%) since the 2006 census. There were 492 households, comprising 705 males and 660 females, giving a sex ratio of 1.07 males per female. The median age was 44.9 years (compared with 37.4 years nationally), with 297 people (21.8%) aged under 15 years, 204 (14.9%) aged 15 to 29, 639 (46.8%) aged 30 to 64, and 225 (16.5%) aged 65 or older.

Ethnicities were 85.7% European/Pākehā, 23.3% Māori, 2.0% Pacific peoples, 0.9% Asian, and 1.5% other ethnicities. People may identify with more than one ethnicity.

The percentage of people born overseas was 12.5, compared with 27.1% nationally.

Although some people chose not to answer the census's question about religious affiliation, 51.0% had no religion, 35.8% were Christian, 3.3% had Māori religious beliefs and 0.9% had other religions.

Of those at least 15 years old, 249 (23.3%) people had a bachelor's or higher degree, and 165 (15.4%) people had no formal qualifications. The median income was $36,600, compared with $31,800 nationally. 195 people (18.3%) earned over $70,000 compared to 17.2% nationally. The employment status of those at least 15 was that 606 (56.7%) people were employed full-time, 192 (18.0%) were part-time, and 15 (1.4%) were unemployed.

Marae

The community has two Ngāti Kahungunu marae.

Te Whatuiāpiti Marae and meeting house is a meeting place of Ngāti Whatuiāpiti. In October 2020, the Government committed $887,291 from the Provincial Growth Fund to upgrade the marae and 4 others, creating 12 jobs.

Kahurānaki Marae and Kahurānaki meeting house is a meeting place of Ngāi Te Rangikoianake and Ngāti Whatuiāpiti. In October 2020, the Government committed $6,020,910 to upgrade Kahurānaki and 17 other marae, creating 39 jobs.

Education

Railway station 
Poukawa had a flag station, opened on 16 February 1876, as part of the Paki Paki to Te Aute section of the Palmerston North–Gisborne Line. By 1891 there were 3 trains a day in each direction, serving a shelter shed, platform, cart approach, loading bank and a short siding. In 1912 an automatic tablet exchanger was added. In 1929 a passing loop was added, which was moved north east, near to Te Mahanga Road, in 1958. In 1967 Te Mahunga Road crossing gained flashing lights and bells, which were added the next year to Station Road crossing as well. The station lost its passenger service on 3 August 1959 and closed on 1 August 1971.

Te Hauke platform 
Te Hauke closed to all traffic on 21 Nov 1958.

References 

Hastings District
Populated places in the Hawke's Bay Region